The FIS Ski Flying World Ski Championships 1979 was held between 17–18 March in Planica, Yugoslavia for the second time in front of total 115,000 people in four days.

Schedule

Rules
Scoring system rules were changed in the last moment, just two days before official competition. Originally total 3 of 9 jumps, the best one of each three days was supposed to go into final score. But technical delegate of competition, Norwegian Torbjørn Yggeseth who is known as the founder of the World Cup, proposed the change of rules: total 6 of 9 jumps, the best two of each three days were incorporated. Although only 4 of 6 rounds counted at the end as first day of competition was canceled.

To perform on Saturday and Sunday competition, competitor had to reach 75% average of top 10 jumps in at least one round on official training on Thursday or at first day of competition on Friday.

Competition
On 14 March 1979 hill test in three rounds was on schedule. Križaj opened the hill with 142 metres, Bizjak's binds got off in the inrun and he managed to stop. Loštrek set the longest distance of the day at 158 metres.

On 15 March 1979 official training in front of 10,000 people was on schedule with two rounds in rain. František Novák set the distance of the day at 169 metres.

On 16 March 1979 first day of competition with three rounds was on schedule. Everything was over only after 8 testjumpers on a disappointment of 15,000 people due to heavy rain. Test jumper Ivo Zupan set the distance of the day at 159 metres.

On 17 March 1979 second day of competition with three rounds was on schedule in front of 40,000 people. Test jumper Ivo Zupan was first that day who set Yugoslavian record at 171 metres. In the second round East German Axel Zitzmann crashed at world record distance at 179 metres, second round was canceled and repeated right after. Zitzmann was leading after first 2 best of 3 jumps of second day of competition.

On 18 March 1979 the last day of competition with three rounds was on schedule in front of 50,000 people. A lot of inrun speed/gate testing were made before the first round. Kogler set the best distance of the second round at 156 metres. Just before the third round, East German test jumper Klaus Ostwald set the world record at 176 metres. Armin Kogler became the world champion after 4 of 6 best flights in two days of competition.

Hill test
10:00 AM — 14 March 1979 — Three rounds — test jumpers — chronological order

Official training
15 March 1979 — 2 rounds — test — chronological order incomplete

15 March 1979 — 2 rounds (the first repeated) — competitors — chronological order

Competition: Day 1
9:30 AM — 16 March 1979 — 3 rounds — test — chronological order

Competition: Day 2
17 March 1979 — 2 best of 3 rounds — second round was canceled and repeated — chronological order

Competition: Day 3
18 March 1979 — incomplete — test

18 March 1979 — 2 best of 3 rounds — competitors

 Not recognized. Crash at WR! Didn't count into final results! Didn't count into final result! World record! Crash, touch!

Official results
17 to 18 March 1979 — 4 best of 6 rounds — first day canceled — originally 6 best of 9 rounds scheduled

Ski flying world records

 Not recognized! Crash at world record distance.

Medal table

References

FIS Ski Flying World Championships
1979 in ski jumping
1979 in Slovenia
1979 in Yugoslav sport
Ski jumping competitions in Yugoslavia
International sports competitions hosted by Slovenia
International sports competitions hosted by Yugoslavia
March 1979 sports events in Europe